In geometric topology, the side-approximation theorem was proved by . It implies that a 2-sphere in R3 can be approximated by polyhedral 2-spheres.

References

Geometric topology
Theorems in topology